William Ewing Hoy (2 April 1952 – 19 December 2002) was an English racing driver and the 1991 British Touring Car Champion, the highlight of a 20-year career in motor racing.

Biography
Born in Melbourn, Cambridgeshire, Hoy did not begin racing until his late 20s and first raced at international level in 1985, taking on the full World Sportscar Championship including Le Mans. Over the next few years, he raced in an assortment of championships and one-off races, the highlight undoubtedly being second overall in the 1988 All Japan Touring Car Championship. Hoy supplemented his racing career as a fully qualified chartered surveyor, employed first by Bernard Thorpe and latterly by DTZ. In late 2002, Hoy suffered an inoperable brain tumour and died shortly afterwards. He is survived by his wife and three children.

Racing career
For 1991 he concentrated on the BTCC, in the first season of Super Touring regulations. Although manufacturers including Vauxhall and Toyota had factory entries, the established BMWs were the car to have initially. Hoy made full use of his opportunity in a car entered by Vic Lee, building a championship lead nobody was able to overhaul. He also won the Willhire 24 Hour at Snetterton in a BMW M3, partnering Ray Bellm and Kurt Luby. For 1992 he was signed by the Toyota team, went into the final round in a three way tussle for the championship but was beaten by Tim Harvey's BMW. However, the car was not competitive in subsequent seasons, Toyota won once in 1993 with Julian Bailey at Knockhill. The closest Hoy came was at Silverstone in 1993, when he was punted off onto his roof by team-mate Julian Bailey, an incident remembered for Murray Walker's commentary line "the car upside down is a Toyota", a play on the company's advertising slogan of the time (The car in front is a Toyota). In 1994, Hoy drove a factory prepared Toyota Celica in the RAC Rally, of the World Rally Championship, but famously crashed into a tree on stage 4 of the rally. He and his co-driver were unhurt in the accident.

Despite 2 largely result-free seasons, Hoy was still an established star, and Renault hired him alongside Alain Menu for 1995. The early part of the season was a disaster, with many mechanical failures and crashes, although in the latter part of the season Hoy moved up to 4th with 3 race wins, in what was now the fastest car. Hopes of a title push for 1996 was erased by the entry of the 4-wheel drive Audi of Frank Biela. Although Menu was again championship runner-up, Hoy slipped back to 9th.

The BTCC of this era was dominated by high-investment manufacturer teams, largely made up of overseas former single-seater drivers. Like Tim Harvey and Robb Gravett, Hoy was struggling to remain in a competitive car or make use of it. He went to a fading Ford team for 1997 and 1998. 1997 was somewhat disappointing but 1998 was a much better performance, with Hoy finishing in the top 10 in the championship in one of the least competitive works cars and even picked up a race win at Round 4 at Silverstone. Hoy raced independently in the BTCC for part of 1999, outperforming the rest of the independents in a half-season campaign using the Arena Motorsport Renault Laguna before entering semi-retirement. He also competed with Chamberlain Motorsport for two rounds of 1999 FIA GT Championship. His last appearance came at Silverstone in 2000 in a Class B Vic Lee Racing Peugeot 306, securing pole position in class for both races, but retired from both races with mechanical failures. Hoy was a commentator for the 2002 BTCC season alongside Ben Edwards in addition to being part of the works Honda BTCC team in a managerial role alongside driver, Andy Priaulx.

Racing record

Complete World Sportscar Championship results
(key) (Races in bold indicate pole position) (Races in italics indicate fastest lap)

Complete British Touring Car Championship results
(key) Races in bold indicate pole position (1 point awarded – 1996 onwards in all races, 1987–1989 and 2000 in class)  Races in italics indicate fastest lap (1 point awarded – 1987–1989 in class) (* signifies that driver lead feature race for at least one lap – 1 point awarded 1998 onwards)

 – Race was stopped due to heavy rain. No points were awarded.
† Not eligible for points. ‡ Endurance driver.

Complete Japanese Touring Car Championship results
(key) (Races in bold indicate pole position) (Races in italics indicate fastest lap)

Complete European Touring Car Championship results

(key) (Races in bold indicate pole position) (Races in italics indicate fastest lap)

† Not eligible for points.

Complete Asia-Pacific Touring Car Championship results
(key) (Races in bold indicate pole position) (Races in italics indicate fastest lap)

Complete Italian Touring Car Championship results
(key) (Races in bold indicate pole position) (Races in italics indicate fastest lap)

‡ Guest driver – not eligible for points

Complete FIA GT Championship results
(key) (Races in bold indicate pole position) (Races in italics indicate fastest lap)

Complete 24 Hours of Le Mans results

Complete 24 Hours of Spa results

Complete WRC results

References

External links

Driver Profile on BTCC Pages

British Touring Car Championship drivers
British Touring Car Championship Champions
1952 births
People from Royston, Hertfordshire
2002 deaths
24 Hours of Le Mans drivers
World Sportscar Championship drivers
People from Melbourn
BMW M drivers
Arena Motorsport drivers
TOM'S drivers